Reefton Harry Adolphus Spicer (17 July 1898 – 22 April 1978) was an Australian rules footballer who played with Richmond in the Victorian Football League (VFL).

Family
The son of Ernest Edward Spicer (1877-1936), and Adelina Ann Elizabeth Spicer (1877-1943), née Bailhache, Reefton Harry Adolphus Spicer, known as "Harry", was born at South Yarra, Victoria on 17 July 1898.

He married Doris Annie O'Brien (1900-1974) in 1925.

Football

Richmond (VFL)
Recruited from Richmond Districts, he played on the wing and in the back-pocket for the Richmond Football Club — in one senior game in 1917, and in two senior games in 1918.

Brunswick (VFA)
Cleared from Richmond, he played one senior game for the Brunswick Football Club in 1919.

Williamstown (VFA)
He played four senior games for the Williamstown Football Club in 1920.

Death
He died at Brighton, Victoria on 22 April 1978.

Footnotes

References
 
 Hogan P: The Tigers Of Old, Richmond FC, (Melbourne), 1996.

External links 
 
 
 Reefton Spicer, at The VFA Project.

1898 births
1978 deaths
Australian rules footballers from Victoria (Australia)
Richmond Football Club players
Brunswick Football Club players
Williamstown Football Club players